Invicta Plastics Ltd. was a plastics manufacturing company, founded in 1946 by Edward Jones-Fenleigh (Incorporated as a PLC in 1951, previously Invicta Industries). They had a headquarters in Oadby up until 2009, when they moved to Scudamore Road, where they remained until their insolvency in 2013. They were particularly known for their production of the Mastermind Board Game. They were also responsible for the manufacture of ‘Red Noses’ for Comic Relief in the 1980s and 1990s.

History

The company was founded by Edward J. Jones-Fenleigh in 1946, and was incorporated as a PLC in 1951. In the early years of the company, their services included injection moulding, thermoplastic sheet moulding, and vacuum forming. In 1951, the company moved to their Oadby headquarters, where it remained until 2009. During this period, they served clients such as Coca-Cola, Unilever and Reckitt Benckiser. The site was demolished, and a Waitrose was built in the location, opening in 2010. The company went into MBO in 2013, where a Management Buyout occurred, with Make a Material Difference Ltd. procuring several divisions of Invicta Plastics Ltd.

Notable Products

Mastermind or Master Mind, a code-breaking board game for two players launched in 1971. It was one of the more prominent products of the company, with them professing sales in excess of a million units. The success of the game led to them winning the Queen’s Award for Export in 1978. They also made a handheld electronic device based on the game.

Invicta Plastics also produced a line of plastic dinosaurs in conjunction with the British Natural History Museum from 1974.

The company manufactured the Comic Relief ‘Red Noses’ for a number of years in the 1980s and 1990s. Of particular note, in 1995, they produced heat responsive colour changing noses.

References 

Plastics companies
British companies disestablished in 2013
Manufacturing companies based in Leicester